Delphine Claire Beltiane Seyrig (10 April 1932 – 15 October 1990) was a Lebanese-born French actress and film director. She came to prominence in Alain Resnais's 1961 film Last Year at Marienbad, and later acted in films by Francois Truffaut, Luis Buñuel, Marguerite Duras, Fred Zinneman, and Chantal Akerman. She directed three films, including Sois belle et tais-toi (1981).

Early life
Seyrig was born into an intellectual Protestant family. Her Alsatian father, Henri Seyrig, was the director of the Beirut Archaeological Institute and later France's cultural attaché in New York during World War II. Her mother, was Swiss, and the niece of linguist/semiologist Ferdinand de Saussure.

Delphine was the sister of composer Francis Seyrig. Her family moved from Lebanon to New York City when she was ten. When the family returned to Lebanon in the late 1940s, she was sent to school at the Collège Protestant de Jeunes Filles, which had been founded by Protestant pacifists and social justice activists in 1938. She attended the school from 1947 to 1950.

Career
As a young woman, Seyrig studied acting at the Comédie de Saint-Étienne, training under Jean Dasté, and at Centre Dramatique de l'Est. She appeared briefly in small roles in the 1954 TV series Sherlock Holmes. In 1956, she returned to New York and studied at the Actors Studio. In 1958, she appeared in her first film, Pull My Daisy. In New York she met director Alain Resnais, who asked her to star in his film Last Year at Marienbad (1961). Her performance brought her international recognition and she moved to Paris. Among her roles of this period is the older married woman in François Truffaut's Stolen Kisses (1968).

During the 1960s and 1970s, Seyrig worked with directors including Truffaut, Luis Buñuel, Marguerite Duras, and Fred Zinnemann, as well as Resnais. She achieved recognition for both her stage and film work, and was named best actress at the Venice Film Festival for her role in Resnais' Muriel (1963). She played many diverse roles, and because she was fluent in French, English and German, she appeared in films in all three languages, including a number of Hollywood productions.

Seyrig may be most widely known for her role as Colette de Montpellier in Zinnemann's 1973 film The Day of the Jackal. In turn, perhaps her most demanding role was in Chantal Akerman's 1975 film Jeanne Dielman, 23 quai du Commerce, 1080 Bruxelles, in which she was required to adopt a highly restrained, rigorously minimalistic mode of acting to convey the mindset of the title character.

Seyrig was a major feminist figure in France. Throughout her career, she used her celebrity status to promote women's rights. The most important of the three films she directed was the 1977 Sois belle et tais-toi (Be Pretty and Shut Up), which included actresses Shirley MacLaine, Maria Schneider, and Jane Fonda, speaking frankly about the level of sexism they had to deal with in the film industry. She also directed with Carole Roussopoulos an adaptation of the SCUM Manifesto by Valerie Solanas. In 1982, Seyrig was the key member of the group that established the Paris-based Centre Audiovisuel Simone de Beauvoir, which maintains a large archive of women's filmed and recorded work and produces work by and about women. In 1989, Seyrig was given a festival tribute at Créteil International Women's Film Festival, France.

Les Insoumuses
Seyrig, Carole Roussopoulos, and translator Ioana Wieder, formed the feminist video collective  Les Insoumuses in 1975, after meeting at a video-editing workshop that Roussopoulos organized in her apartment. The name Les Insoumuses is a neologism combining "insoumise" (disobedient) and "muses." The collective produced several videos together, focusing on representations of women in the media, labour, and reproductive rights.

Personal life 
Seyrig married (and was later divorced from) American painter Jack Youngerman (1926–2020), who had studied at the École des Beaux-Arts in Paris. Their son Duncan (b. 1956, Paris) is a musician and composer working in both France and the United States; and granddaughter Selina Youngerman, who is a working actress, is based in London.

In 1971, Seyrig signed the Manifesto of the 343, publicly declaring she had had an illegal abortion. She was the unrequited love of Anglo-French actor, Michael Lonsdale.

Death 
Seyrig died in Paris in 1990, aged 58, from cancer. She was interred there in Montparnasse Cemetery.

Select filmography (acting)
 1954 Sherlock Holmes in "The Mother Hubbard Case", "The Case of the Singing Violin"
 1959 Pull My Daisy, as the wife of Milo
 1961 Last Year at Marienbad, as A - La femme brune
 1963 Muriel, as Hélène Aughain
 1966 Who Are You, Polly Magoo?, as a journalist
 1967 Accident, as Francesca
 1968 Stolen Kisses, as Fabienne Tabard
 1969 Mr. Freedom, as Marie-Madeleine
 1969 The Milky Way, as La prostituée 
 1970 Le Lys dans la vallée (TV), as Mme de Mortsauf
 1970 Donkey Skin, as La fée des Lilas (The Lilac Fairy)
 1971 Daughters of Darkness (Le rouge aux lèvres), as Countess Bathory
 1971 Tartuffe (TV), as Elmire
 1972 The Discreet Charm of the Bourgeoisie, as Simone Thévenot
 1973 The Day of the Jackal, as Collette de Montpellier
 1973 A Doll's House, as Kristine Linde
 1974 The Black Windmill, as Celi Burrows
 1974 The Heart's Cry, as Mme Bunkermann
 1975 Aloïse, as Aloïse adulte
 1975 The Last Word, as Simone
 1975 Le Jardin qui bascule, as Kate
 1975 Jeanne Dielman, 23 quai du Commerce, 1080 Bruxelles, as Jeanne Dielman
 1975 India Song, as Anne-Marie Stretter
 1976 Caro Michele, as Adriana Vivanti
 1976 Son nom de Venise dans Calcutta désert, as Anne-Marie Stretter
 1977 Baxter, Vera Baxter, as L'inconnue
 1977 Repérages, as Julie
 1979 Utkozben, as Barabara
 1980 Le Chemin perdu, as Mathilde Schwarz
 1980 Chère inconnue, as Yvette
 1981 Le Petit Pommier (TV), as La mère
 1981 The Man of Destiny (TV), as The Lady
 1983 Le Grain de sable, as Solange
 1984 , as Dr. Mabuse
 1986 Seven Women, Seven Sins (segment "Pride")
 1986 Golden Eighties, as Jeanne Schwartz
 1986 Les Étonnements d'un couple moderne (TV), as Marie-Claude Poitevin
 1986 Letters Home, as Aurelia Plath
 1989 Johanna D'Arc of Mongolia, as Lady Windermere

Filmography (directing)
 1975 Maso et Miso vont en bateau
 1976 Scum Manifesto
 1981 Sois belle et tais-toi

References

Sources
 François Poirié. Comme une apparition: Delphine Seyrig, portrait, Actes Sud, 28 February 2007 (paperback);

External links
 
 Adapted from the article Delphine Seyrig, from Wikinfo, licensed under the Creative Commons Attribution-Share Alike license and the GFDL
 Delphine Seyrig in Conversation with Melinda Camber Porter from Through Parisian Eyes PDF
 Centre Audiovisuel Simone de Beauvoir

1932 births
1990 deaths
20th-century French actresses
Actresses from Paris
Burials at Montparnasse Cemetery
Deaths from cancer in France
French film actresses
French film directors
French feminists
French stage actresses
French women film directors
French Protestants
Volpi Cup for Best Actress winners
Signatories of the 1971 Manifesto of the 343